The following is a list of the 100 largest cities in Africa by city proper population using the most recent official estimate. This reflects only cities located geographically in Africa including nearby islands.

List of cities in Africa by their population
Bold represents largest city in country, Italics represents capital city.

Map

See also
 List of urban areas in Africa by population
 List of European cities by population within city limits

References

 
Cities by population
Africa